The term Pewabic could refer to:

SS Pewabic, an American freighter in service from 1863 to 1865
Pewabic Pottery, a ceramic studio and school in Detroit, Michigan